Lacuna (plural lacunas or lacunae) may refer to:

Related to the meaning "gap"
 Lacuna (manuscripts), a gap in a manuscript, inscription, text, painting, or musical work
Great Lacuna, a lacuna of eight leaves where there was heroic Old Norse poetry in the Codex Regius
 Lacuna (music), an intentional, extended passage in a musical work during which no notes are played
 Scientific lacuna, an area of science that has not been studied but has potential to be studied
 Lacuna or accidental gap, in linguistics, a word that does not exist but which would be permitted by the rules of a language
 Lacuna, in law, largely overlapping a non liquet ("it is not clear"), a gap (in the law)

In medicine
 Lacuna (histology), a small space containing an osteocyte in bone, or chondrocyte in cartilage
 Muscular lacuna, a lateral compartment of the thigh 
 Vascular lacuna, a medial compartment beneath the inguinal ligament
 Lacuna magna, the largest of several recesses in the urethra

Other uses
 Lacuna (comics), a fictional Marvel Comics character
 Lacuna (film), a 2012 Chinese romantic comedy film 
 Lacuna (gastropod), a genus of sea snails in the family Littorinidae
 Helcogramma lacuna (H. lacuna), a species of fish in the genus Helcogramma
 Mallomonas lacuna (M. lacuna), a species of heterokont algae
 Lacuna Island, Antarctica
 Jessie Lacuna (born 1993), a Filipino swimmer
 The Lacuna, a 2009 novel by Barbara Kingsolver
 Lacuna, Inc., a fictional company in the 2004 film Eternal Sunshine of the Spotless Mind
 Lacuna, the name of several lakes of Titan, the moon of Saturn

See also
 Lacuna model, a tool for unlocking culture differences or missing "gaps" in text
 Lacunar amnesia, loss of memory about one specific event
 Lacunar stroke, in medicine, the most common type of stroke
 Lacuna Coil, an Italian hard rock/metal band
 Lacunary function, an analytic function in mathematics
Lacunarity, a measure of gappiness in mathematics
Lacunary polynomial, or sparse polynomial
 Petrovsky lacuna, in mathematics
 Laguna (disambiguation)